The first season of Drag Race France premiered on June 25, 2022. The cast was announced on June 2, 2022. The winner of the first season of Drag Race France was Paloma, with La Grande Dame and Soa de Muse as runners-up.

Casting occurred in end 2021 with production starting in early 2022. On March 4, 2022, it was announced that the judges panel will include RuPaul's Drag Race season 12 contestant Nicky Doll, TV host and columnist Daphné Bürki and DJ and dancer Kiddy Smile.

The season consisted of eight one-hour episodes.

Contestants 

Ages, names, and cities stated are at time of filming.

Notes:

Contestant progress

Lip syncs
Legend:

Notes:

Guest judges
Listed in chronological order:

Jean Paul Gaultier, fashion designer
Iris Mittenaere, Miss France 2016 and Miss Universe 2016
Marianne James, singer, actress and TV host
, fashion designer
, journalist and Elle's managing editor
Bilal Hassani, singer-songwriter and Eurovision finalist
Shy'm, singer
Yanis Marshall, dancer and choreographer
, fashion designer
Yseult, singer-songwriter and model
Raya Martigny, model
, fashion journalist and documentary filmmaker
Olivier Rousteing, fashion designer and creative director of Balmain
Nicolas Huchard, choreographer

Special guests
Guests who appeared in episodes, but did not judge on the main stage.
Bérengère Krief, actress and comedian
Anthonin Fabre, YouTuber

Episodes

References

2022 in LGBT history
2022 French television seasons
Drag Race France
France